Rick Schweizer is a retired American soccer goalkeeper who played professionally in the Major Indoor Soccer League and American Indoor Soccer Association. He was the 1985 AISA Goalkeeper of the Year. Schweizer coached both collegiately and professionally. He was the 1990 National Professional Soccer League Coach of the Year.

Player
In 1980, Schweizer graduated from the University of New Haven where he was a three-year starter on the men's soccer team. In 1980, he signed with the Hartford Hellions of the Major Indoor Soccer League. In 1981, he moved to the Pittsburgh Spirit for three seasons. In 1984, Schweizer signed with the Louisville Thunder of the American Indoor Soccer Association. He was a 1985 First Team All Star and the 1985 AISA Goalkeeper of the Year.  In 1986, he moved to the Milwaukee Wave for two seasons. In the spring of 1988, the Wave released him and Schweizer moved to the Dayton Dynamo. He briefly retired after becoming the Dynamo's head coach. However, he returned to playing when the Dynamo released goalkeeper Arnie Mausser in January 1989.

Coach
On September 14, 1988, Schweizer became the head coach of the Dayton Dynamo. He coached the team for two seasons, being named the 1990 AISA Coach of the Year.  On February 26, 1991, he became the head coach of the New York Kick which folded at the end of the season. In June 1995, the Connecticut Kicks hired Schweizer as head coach. However, the Kicks never played a game. He also served as an assistant coach with the University of New Haven women's team.

References

External links
 MISL stats

Living people
1959 births
American soccer coaches
American Indoor Soccer Association players
Dayton Dynamo players
Hartford Hellions players
Louisville Thunder players
Major Indoor Soccer League (1978–1992) players
Milwaukee Wave players
National Professional Soccer League (1984–2001) coaches
Pittsburgh Spirit players
Soccer players from New York City
University of New Haven alumni
Association football goalkeepers
Association football players not categorized by nationality